Guy Ravier (born 29 November 1937) is a French politician.

Early life
Guy Ravier was born on November 29, 1937 in Avignon.

Career
He served as a member of the National Assembly from 1988 to 1993. He was also the Mayor of his hometown, Avignon, from 1989 to 1995.

References

1937 births
Living people
Socialist Party (France) politicians
Deputies of the 9th National Assembly of the French Fifth Republic
Mayors of Avignon